Mangowal Sharqi ( lit. East Mangowal) is a village situated near Jalalpur Jattan cantonment in the district of Gujrat, Pakistan. It is the third-largest village in the district. The village is situated at bifurcation leading to Tanda and Karianwala. 

The history of the village is not well known. According to local traditions, this village is about 300 years old and was founded by the son of a Hindu Jutt.

See also
 Mangowal Gharbi

References

Villages in Gujrat District